Below is a list of notable women's artistic gymnastics events scheduled to be held in 2016, as well as the medalists.

Retirements

Calendar of events

International Medalists (WAG)

Major Competitions

International Championships

Continental Championships

Challenge Cup and World Cup Series

Challenge Cup Series

World Cup Series

National Championships
Note: Although England, Scotland, and Wales are listed as individual countries in the table below, gymnasts from these countries compete under the flag of Great Britain at all major international competitions, except for the Commonwealth Games.

Season's best international scores 
Note: Only the scores of senior gymnasts from international events have been included below. In major international competitions such as the World Championships, countries are limited to only two athletes in each final. Finalists in the 2016 Olympic Games are highlighted in green.

All-around

Vault

Uneven bars

Balance beam

Floor exercise

References

Artistic
Gymnastics by year
Artistic gymnastics